The Treasure of Cantenac (French: Le trésor de Cantenac) is a 1950 French comedy film directed by Sacha Guitry and starring Guitry, Lana Marconi and Michel Lemoine.

The film's sets were designed by the art director René Renoux.

Cast
 Sacha Guitry as le baron de Cantenac et le conteur
 Lana Marconi as Virginie Lacassagne
 Michel Lemoine as Paul Pidoux
 Marcel Simon as le centenaire
 René Génin as le maire et le curé
 Pauline Carton as Eulalie, la bonne du curé
 Jeanne Fusier-Gir as Mme Lacassagne, la mercière
 Fernand René as Anselme Fortune, le poivrot
 Roger Legris as l'idiot du village
 Milly Mathis as Madeleine, la patronne du café
 Paul Demange as Jean, le mari de Madeleine
 Henry Laverne as Pierre, l'amant de Madeleine
 Solange Varenne as Sidonie, la bergère
 Claire Brilletti as Blanche, la nourrice
 Maximilienne as Blandine, la petite-fille du centenaire
 Germaine Duard as Marie, la servante du baron
 Luce Fabiole as Léonie
 Yvonne Hébert as Thérèse
 Sophie Mallet as Claire
 Marthe Sarbel as Zoé
 Laure Paillette as Lucie
 Aziza Ali as la romanichelle
 Bob Roucoules as le docteur
 Robert Seller as Isidore
 Jacques de Féraudy as Simon
 Pierre Juvenet as Urbain
 André Numès Fils as Gustave
 Roger Poirier as Auguste
 Georges Bever as Bernard
 Léon Walther as Firmin
 Jacques Sablon as Prosper
 René Gréthen as Onésime
 Courtet as Elisée
 Varougeanne as le gitan
 Fouassin as l'unijambiste
 Georges Spanelly as l'architecte
 Jacques Hérisson
 Laverne Fils
 Alex Madis

References

Bibliography 
 Keit, Alain. Le cinéma de Sacha Guitry: vérités, représentations, simulacres. Editions du CEFAL, 1999.

External links 
 

1950 films
French comedy films
1950 comedy films
1950s French-language films
Films directed by Sacha Guitry
French black-and-white films
1950s French films